Yang Yunsong (Chinese: , p Yáng Yúnsōng) was a Tang-era Taoist writer credited with the authorship of the Green Satchel Classic.

References

Chinese spiritual writers
Tang dynasty writers
Politicians from Maoming
Tang dynasty politicians from Guangdong
Writers from Maoming
Deified Chinese people